Nanendu Nimmavane (Kannada: ನಾನೆಂದೂ ನಿಮ್ಮವನೆ; English: I am always yours) is a 1993 Indian Kannada film, directed by H. S. Phani Ramachandra and produced by Dashami Technicians. The film stars Vishnuvardhan, Srishanthi, Ramesh Bhat and Vinaya Prasad in the lead roles. The film has musical score by Rajan–Nagendra.

The movie was based on the novel Repati Koduku (Little Rascal) by Malladi Venkata Krishna Murthy. The core story line, plot twists and the climax of the 1994 Malayalam movie Minnaram (which was later remade in Hindi as Hungama 2) was heavily inspired by this movie.

Cast

Vishnuvardhan as Gopalakrishna
Prakash Rai
Vinaya Prasad as Devaki
Srishanthi as Radha
Ramesh Bhat as Mukunda
Jai Jagadish as Jagadish
Lokanath as Gopalakrishna's father
Vaishali Kasaravalli as Girija 
Prithviraj
 M. S. Karanth
Sihi Kahi Chandru
Honnavalli Krishna
Thriveni as Pramila

References

External links
 

Indian comedy films
1990s Kannada-language films
Films scored by Rajan–Nagendra
Films based on Indian novels
Films directed by Phani Ramachandra